Johan Erik Nylander (born 3 April 1981 in Norberg, Sweden) is a Swedish jazz musician (drums), improviser and composer, working in Norway since 2002. He plays in several bands, among them Ola Kvernberg Trio, "Kobert", Kirsti Huke Quartet, Tore Brunborg Trio, "Liarbird", Bjørn Alterhaug Quintet, "Peloton", Juxtaposed, Magic Pocket, "Monoswezi", and his own Erik Nylanders Orkester.

Career 
After completing high school at Domarhagsskolan, Nylander studied on the Jazz program at Trondheim Musikkonservatorium (2002–04). He fold recognition on the Norwegian and Nordic jazz scenes within various projects and contributed on a number of releases, among them the album Corrupted Mirror (2009), in a meeting with Karl Stømme (trumpet) and Steinar Nickelsen (keyboard). The album took shape in the studio where the musicians met without any specific intention to record an album. The idea was to use the three instruments in interaction playing all kinds of music, coming naturally in the moment. The recordings were made in three different sessions. Most of the tracks are improvised on the spot, but also includes compositions written by Strømme and Nickelsen. The Oberheim OB-X synthesizer from 1980 was crucial for the album soundscape.

In 2005 he performed at the international Jazz festival Nattjazz in Bergen, Norway, with Marita Røstad & "Velvet City". The album A festa Vale Tudo (2009) within his Erik Nylanders Orchestra (including Eivind Lønning, Espen Reinertsen, Hanna Gjermundrød, Ole Morten Vågan and Petter Vågan) marked Nylander's debut as a record producer and band leader. He has also collaboratively initiated several other band projects.

Discography

As band leader 
 2009: A festa Vale Tudo, within Erik Nylanders Orkester

Collaborative works 
Within Ola Kvernberg Trio
 2004: Night driver (Jazzland Recordings), performing Nylanders own compositions
 2009: Folk (Jazzland)

Within Kobert
 2006: Glowing (NorCD)
 2009: Trondheim Jazz Orchestra and Kobert (MNJ Records), fra at Moldejazz 2008

 2009: Invasion of Privacy (Impeller Recordings)
 2011: Off The Hook (Øra Fonogram)

Within The Espen Reinertsen Organic Jukebox
 2007: Subaquatic Disco (Aim Records)

Within Peloton
 2007: Selected Recordings
 2011: The Early Years

Within Bjørn Alterhaug Quintet
 2009: Songlines (Ponca Jazz)

With Steinar Nickelsen and Karl Strømme
 2009: Corrupted Mirror

Within Magic Pocket
 2011: The Katabatic Wind (Bolage), featuring Morten Qvenild
 2011: Kinetic Music (MNJ Records), with Trondheim Jazz Orchestra, fra Moldejazz 2010

Within Liarbird
 2011: Liarbird (Bolage)

Within Monkeybar (duo with Steinar Nickelsen)
 2012: Dear You (Parallell)

Within the trio Kirsti, Ola and Erik
 2015: Rags & Silk (Name Music & Publishing)

References

External links
 Ola Kvernberg Trio – Sardinen USF 16 November 2012, Bergen Jazzforum on YouTube

1981 births
Living people
Swedish jazz drummers
Norwegian jazz drummers
Male drummers
20th-century Norwegian drummers
21st-century Norwegian drummers
Swedish jazz composers
Male jazz composers
Norwegian jazz composers
20th-century drummers
20th-century Swedish male musicians
20th-century Swedish musicians
21st-century Swedish male musicians
Ola Kvernberg Trio members
Magic Pocket members